H₂eryo-men has been reconstructed as a deity in charge of welfare and the community in proto indo european mythology, connected to the building and maintenance of roads or pathways, but also with healing and the institution of marriage.

Etymology 
His name derives from the noun *h₂eryos (a "member of one's own group", "one who belongs to the community", in contrast to an outsider), also at the origin of the Indo-Iranian *árya, "noble, hospitable", and the Celtic *aryo-, "free man" (Old Irish: aire, "noble, chief"; Gaulish: arios, "free man, lord").

His name is also transliterated as Xaryomen

Descendant deities 
The Vedic god Aryaman is frequently mentioned in the Vedas, and associated with social and marital ties. In the Gāthās, the Iranian god Airyaman seems to denote the wider tribal network or alliance, and is invoked in a prayer against illness, magic, and evil. In the mythical stories of the founding of the Irish nation, the hero Érimón became the first king of the Milesians (the mythical name of the Irish) after he helped conquer the island from the Tuatha Dé Danann. He also provided wives to the Cruithnig (the mythical Celtic Britons or Picts), a reflex of the marital functions of *h₂eryo-men. The Gaulish given name Ariomanus, possibly translated as "lord-spirited" and generally borne by Germanic chiefs, is also to be mentioned.

See Also 

 Aryan
 Pehuson

References

Bibliography

 

 
 

Proto-Indo-European deities
Reconstructed words
Proto-Indo-European mythology